Pterolophia is a genus of longhorn beetles of the subfamily Lamiinae, containing the following species:

subgenus Ale
 Pterolophia affinis Breuning, 1938
 Pterolophia agraria (Pascoe, 1865)
 Pterolophia albescens Breuning, 1938
 Pterolophia albicans Breuning, 1938
 Pterolophia albohumeralis Breuning, 1961
 Pterolophia albotarsalis Breuning, 1938
 Pterolophia albovaria Breuning, 1938
 Pterolophia albovittata Breuning, 1938
 Pterolophia annamensis Breuning, 1939
 Pterolophia annularis Breuning, 1938
 Pterolophia anoplagiata Aurivillius, 1911
 Pterolophia apicefasciata Breuning, 1938
 Pterolophia arrowiana Breuning, 1938
 Pterolophia assamana Breuning, 1968
 Pterolophia australica Breuning, 1938
 Pterolophia baliana Breuning, 1980
 Pterolophia bangi Pic, 1937
 Pterolophia basalis (Pascoe, 1875)
 Pterolophia basicristata Breuning, 1938
 Pterolophia basiflavipennis Breuning, 1970 inq.
 Pterolophia bicostata Breuning, 1943
 Pterolophia bicristulata Breuning, 1940
 Pterolophia bilatevittata Breuning, 1942
 Pterolophia binaluana Breuning, 1938
 Pterolophia binhana Pic, 1926
 Pterolophia biplagiaticollis Breuning, 1961 inq.
 Pterolophia bispinosa Breuning, 1938
 Pterolophia bizonata MacLeay, 1886
 Pterolophia blairiella Breuning, 1938
 Pterolophia brunnea Breuning, 1938
 Pterolophia brunnescens Breuning, 1938
 Pterolophia camela Pic, 1926
 Pterolophia chekiangensis Gressitt, 1942
 Pterolophia coenosa Matsushita, 1953
 Pterolophia concreta (Pascoe, 1865)
 Pterolophia conformis (Pascoe, 1865)
 Pterolophia costalis (Pascoe, 1862)
 Pterolophia coxalis Breuning, 1943
 Pterolophia crenatocristata Breuning, 1938
 Pterolophia cylindricollis Gressitt, 1942
 Pterolophia declivis Breuning, 1938
 Pterolophia deformis Breuning, 1939
 Pterolophia duplicata (Pascoe, 1865)
 Pterolophia egumensis Breuning, 1973
 Pterolophia ephippiata (Pascoe, 1865)
 Pterolophia everetti Breuning, 1966
 Pterolophia excavata Breuning, 1938
 Pterolophia excisa Breuning, 1938
 Pterolophia exigua Breuning, 1938
 Pterolophia finitima Breuning, 1943
 Pterolophia flavopicta Breuning, 1938
 Pterolophia forbesi Breuning, 1966
 Pterolophia fractilinea (Pascoe, 1865)
 Pterolophia fulva Breuning, 1938
 Pterolophia fulvobasalis Breuning & de Jong, 1941
 Pterolophia funebris Breuning, 1938
 Pterolophia fuscoplagiata Breuning, 1938
 Pterolophia fuscostictica Breuning, 1938
 Pterolophia gardneriana Breuning, 1938
 Pterolophia geelwinkiana Breuning, 1938
 Pterolophia gibbosipennis Pic, 1926
 Pterolophia gigas Pic, 1937
 Pterolophia gregalis Fisher, 1927
 Pterolophia griseovaria Breuning, 1938
 Pterolophia grossepunctata Breuning, 1938
 Pterolophia hebridarum Breuning, 1938
 Pterolophia hirsuta Breuning, 1943
 Pterolophia honesta Breuning, 1938
 Pterolophia hybrida Newman, 1842
 Pterolophia idionea Fisher, 1927
 Pterolophia idoneoides Breuning, 1980
 Pterolophia indistincta Breuning, 1938
 Pterolophia infirmior Breuning, 1938
 Pterolophia jeanvoinei Pic, 1929
 Pterolophia jugosa Bates, 1873
 Pterolophia kaszabi Breuning, 1954
 Pterolophia keyana Breuning, 1939
 Pterolophia lateraliplagiata Breuning, 1938
 Pterolophia lineatipennis Breuning, 1974
 Pterolophia longula Breuning, 1938
 Pterolophia longulipennis Breuning, 1961
 Pterolophia loochooana Matsushita, 1953
 Pterolophia lumawigiensis Breuning, 1980
 Pterolophia lundbladi Breuning, 1938
 Pterolophia luzonica Breuning, 1938
 Pterolophia malaisei Breuning, 1949
 Pterolophia marmorata Breuning, 1938
 Pterolophia marmorea Breuning, 1938
 Pterolophia marshalliana Breuning, 1938
 Pterolophia mediochracea Breuning, 1938
 Pterolophia mindoroensis Breuning, 1943
 Pterolophia modesta (Gahan, 1894)
 Pterolophia neopomeriana Breuning, 1938
 Pterolophia niasana Breuning, 1938
 Pterolophia niasica Breuning, 1938
 Pterolophia nigrita (Pascoe, 1859)
 Pterolophia nigroconjuncta Breuning & de Jong, 1941
 Pterolophia nigrotransversefasciata Breuning, 1982
 Pterolophia nilghirica Breuning, 1938
 Pterolophia nitidomaculata (Pic, 1944)
 Pterolophia obducta (Pascoe, 1865)
 Pterolophia obliqueplagiata Breuning, 1938
 Pterolophia obliquestriata Breuning, 1938
 Pterolophia ochraceopicta Breuning, 1970
 Pterolophia ochreomaculata Breuning, 1940
 Pterolophia ochreostictica Breuning, 1938
 Pterolophia ochreosticticollis Breuning, 1968
 Pterolophia olivacea Breuning & de Jong, 1941
 Pterolophia palauana Matsushita, 1935
 Pterolophia palawanica Breuning, 1938
 Pterolophia pallida (MacLeay, 1886)
 Pterolophia papuana Breuning, 1938
 Pterolophia pascoei Breuning, 1938
 Pterolophia pendleburyi Breuning, 1961
 Pterolophia peraffinis Breuning, 1938
 Pterolophia perakensis Breuning, 1938
 Pterolophia pici Breuning, 1938
 Pterolophia pictula Breuning, 1938
 Pterolophia postscutellaris Breuning, 1967
 Pterolophia proxima (Gahan, 1894)
 Pterolophia pseudobasalis Breuning, 1961
 Pterolophia pseudocostalis Breuning, 1939
 Pterolophia pulchra Aurivillius, 1921
 Pterolophia quadrituberculata Breuning & de Jong, 1941
 Pterolophia queenslandensis Breuning, 1975
 Pterolophia romani Breuning, 1938
 Pterolophia rosacea Breuning, 1938
 Pterolophia rosselli Breuning, 1982
 Pterolophia rubiensis Breuning, 1968
 Pterolophia rufoloides Breuning, 1940
 Pterolophia rufula Breuning, 1938
 Pterolophia rufuloides Breuning, 1940
 Pterolophia saintaignani Breuning, 1982
 Pterolophia salomonum Breuning, 1938
 Pterolophia sanghiriensis Breuning, 1970
 Pterolophia schmidi Breuning, 1967
 Pterolophia shortlandensis Breuning, 1973
 Pterolophia sibuyensis Breuning, 1938
 Pterolophia sikkimensis Breuning, 1938
 Pterolophia simillima Breuning, 1938 
 Pterolophia simplicior Breuning, 1961
 Pterolophia sinensis (Fairmaire, 1900)
 Pterolophia spinosa Breuning, 1938
 Pterolophia strandi Breuning, 1938
 Pterolophia strandiella Breuning, 1938
 Pterolophia strumosa (Pascoe, 1865)
 Pterolophia subfasciata (Gahan, 1894)
 Pterolophia subsellata (Pascoe, 1865)
 Pterolophia subsignata Breuning, 1938
 Pterolophia subvillaris Breuning, 1980
 Pterolophia sulcaticornis Breuning & de Jong, 1941
 Pterolophia sulcatithorax Pic, 1926
 Pterolophia sumbawana Breuning, 1947
 Pterolophia ternatensis Breuning, 1938
 Pterolophia theresae (Pic, 1944)
 Pterolophia timorensis Breuning, 1943
 Pterolophia tricolor Breuning, 1938
 Pterolophia tricoloripennis Breuning, 1961
 Pterolophia trobriandensis Breuning, 1970
 Pterolophia tsurugiana (Matsushita, 1934)
 Pterolophia tugelensis Breuning, 1961
 Pterolophia uniformipennis Breuning, 1966
 Pterolophia uniformis (Pascoe, 1865)
 Pterolophia vaga (Gahan, 1894)
 Pterolophia vagestriata Breuning, 1938
 Pterolophia variabilis (Pascoe, 1859)
 Pterolophia villaris (Pascoe, 1865)
 Pterolophia viridegrisea Breuning, 1938
 Pterolophia woodlarkiana Breuning, 1973

subgenus Annobonopraonetha
 Pterolophia annobonae Aurivillius, 1910

subgenus Arabopraonetha
 Pterolophia arabica Teocchi, 1992

subgenus Armatopraonetha
 Pterolophia albopunctulata Breuning, 1969
 Pterolophia armata Gahan, 1894
 Pterolophia bifasciata Breuning, 1968
 Pterolophia borneensis Fisher, 1935
 Pterolophia lumawigiana Breuning, 1980
 Pterolophia malabarica Breuning, 1938
 Pterolophia multisignata Pic, 1934
 Pterolophia ochreopunctata Breuning & de Jong, 1941
 Pterolophia pedongana Breuning, 1982

subgenus Australopraonetha
 Pterolophia australis Breuning, 1957
 Pterolophia colffsi Breuning, 1976

subgenus Canopraonetha
 Pterolophia cana Breuning, 1938

subgenus Chaetostigme
 Pterolophia casta (Pascoe, 1875)
 Pterolophia lychrosoides Breuning, 1961
 Pterolophia metallescens Breuning, 1938
 Pterolophia murina (Pascoe, 1859)
 Pterolophia nivea Breuning, 1938

subgenus Curtolophia
 Pterolophia curticornis Breuning, 1974

subgenus Fernandopraonetha
 Pterolophia tubercullicollis Breuning, 1966

subgenus Gibbopraonetha
 Pterolophia quadrigibbosa Pic, 1926
 Pterolophia quadrigibbosipennis Breuning, 1968

subgenus Guineopraonetha
 Pterolophia aeneipennis Breuning & Heyrovsky, 1964

subgenus Hylobrothus
 Pterolophia aequabilis Breuning, 1938
 Pterolophia albanina Gressitt, 1942
 Pterolophia albertisi Breuning, 1939
 Pterolophia albivenosa (Pascoe, 1865)
 Pterolophia albonigra Gressitt, 1940
 Pterolophia annulata (Chevrolat, 1845)
 Pterolophia antennata Breuning & de Jong, 1941
 Pterolophia anticemaculata Breuning, 1938
 Pterolophia apicespinosa Breuning, 1938
 Pterolophia arrowi Breuning, 1938
 Pterolophia atrofasciata (Pic, 1925)
 Pterolophia bambusae Breuning, 1938
 Pterolophia beesoni Breuning, 1938
 Pterolophia bicirculata Breuning, 1938
 Pterolophia bicristata Aurivillius, 1927
 Pterolophia biloba Breuning, 1938
 Pterolophia bisulcaticollis Pic, 1926
 Pterolophia bituberculata Breuning, 1938
 Pterolophia bituberculatoides Breuning, 1976
 Pterolophia carinata (Gahan, 1894)
 Pterolophia celebensis Breuning, 1938
 Pterolophia chebana (Gahan, 1894)
 Pterolophia cochinchinensis Breuning, 1966
 Pterolophia deducta (Pascoe, 1865)
 Pterolophia devittata Aurivillius, 1927
 Pterolophia discalis Gressitt, 1951
 Pterolophia discaloides Breuning, 1982
 Pterolophia dohrni (Pascoe, 1875)
 Pterolophia fuscobiplagiata Breuning & de Jong, 1941
 Pterolophia gigantea Breuning, 1938
 Pterolophia humerosopunctata Breuning, 1938
 Pterolophia indistinctemaculata Breuning, 1968
 Pterolophia innuganensis Breuning, 1966
 Pterolophia inplagiata Breuning, 1980
 Pterolophia javana Breuning, 1938
 Pterolophia laosensis Pic, 1926
 Pterolophia latefascia Schwarzer, 1925
 Pterolophia lateralis Gahan, 1895
 Pterolophia lumawigi Breuning, 1980
 Pterolophia mediocarinata Breuning, 1939
 Pterolophia mediomaculata Breuning, 1940
 Pterolophia misella Breuning, 1938
 Pterolophia moupinensis Breuning, 1973
 Pterolophia multicarinatoides Breuning, 1974
 Pterolophia multigibbulosa Pic, 1937
 Pterolophia nicobarica Breuning, 1938
 Pterolophia nigrofasciata Breuning, 1938
 Pterolophia obscuroides Breuning, 1938
 Pterolophia ochreosignata Breuning, 1974
 Pterolophia ochreotriangularis Breuning, 1958
 Pterolophia ochreotriangularoices Breuning, 1977
 Pterolophia oculata Breuning, 1938
 Pterolophia paracompacta Breuning, 1973
 Pterolophia parobscuroides Breuning, 1973
 Pterolophia partealboantenata Breuning, 1966
 Pterolophia ploemi  (Lacordaire, 1872)
 Pterolophia postfasciculata Pic, 1934
 Pterolophia pseudolaosensis Breuning, 1958
 Pterolophia pulla Breuning, 1939
 Pterolophia robusta (Pic, 1928) 
 Pterolophia simulata (Gahan, 1907)
 Pterolophia siporensis Breuning, 1939
 Pterolophia sobrina (Pascoe, 1865)
 Pterolophia subcostata Breuning, 1938
 Pterolophia sumatrana Breuning, 1938
 Pterolophia szetschuanensis Breuning, 1973
 Pterolophia tibialis Breuning, 1938
 Pterolophia trilineicollis Gressitt, 1951
 Pterolophia tuberculatrix (Fabricius, 1781)
 Pterolophia yunnanensis Breuning, 1974

subgenus Insularepraonetha
 Pterolophia ferrugineotincta Aurivillius, 1926
 Pterolophia insularis Breuning, 1938
 Pterolophia ochreoscutellaris Báguena & Breuning, 1958

subgenus Lychrosis
 Pterolophia afflicta (Pascoe, 1867)
 Pterolophia bivittata (Aurivillius, 1926)
 Pterolophia caballina (Gressitt, 1951)
 Pterolophia fasciata (Gressitt, 1940)
 Pterolophia humerosa (Thomson, 1865)
 Pterolophia luctuosa (Pascoe, 1863)
 Pterolophia mimica (Gressitt, 1942)
 Pterolophia obscuricolor Breuning, 1943
 Pterolophia quadrilineata (Hope, 1841)
 Pterolophia rufipennis (Pic, 1923)
 Pterolophia subbicolor Breuning, 1960
 Pterolophia variegata (Thomson, 1865)
 Pterolophia varipennis (Thomson, 1865)
 Pterolophia zebrina (Pascoe, 1858)

subgenus Mimoron
 Pterolophia brevegibbosa Pic, 1926
 Pterolophia dalbergicola Gressitt, 1951
 Pterolophia pedongensis Breuning, 1969
 Pterolophia phungi (Pic, 1925)
 Pterolophia ropicoides Breuning, 1968

subgenus Ovalopraonetha
 Pterolophia ovalis Breuning, 1938

subgenus Paramimoron
 Pterolophia albolateralis Breuning, 1938
 Pterolophia nigrocirculata Breuning
 Pterolophia speciosa Breuning
 Pterolophia subropicoides Breuning, 1968

subgenus Pilosipraonetha
 Pterolophia apicefasciculata Breuning, 1943
 Pterolophia beccarii Gahan, 1907
 Pterolophia dohertyana Breuning, 1968
 Pterolophia flavoplagiata Breuning, 1938
 Pterolophia obliquelineata Breuning, 1938
 Pterolophia parapilosipes Breuning, 1980
 Pterolophia parovalis Breuning, 1973
 Pterolophia pilosipes Pic, 1926
 Pterolophia truncatella Breuning, 1943
 Pterolophia tuberosicollis Breuning, 1943

subgenus Principipraonetha
 Pterolophia consimilis Breuning, 1943
 Pterolophia principis Aurivillius, 1910
 Pterolophia pseudoprincipis Breuning, 1943

subgenus Prosplopraonetha
 Pterolophia prosoploides Breuning, 1961

subgenus Pseudale
 Pterolophia adachii (Hayashi, 1983)
 Pterolophia dorsotuberculare Hayashi, 1984
 Pterolophia fasciata (Schwarzer, 1925)
 Pterolophia izumikurana (Hayashi, 1971)
 Pterolophia jiriensis Danilevsky, 1996
 Pterolophia koshikijimana Makihara, 2006
 Pterolophia kyushuensis Takakuwa, 1988
 Pterolophia obovata (Hayashi, 1971)
 Pterolophia oshimana Breuning, 1955
 Pterolophia suginoi Makihara, 1986

subgenus Pterolophia
 Pterolophia aberrans Aurivillius, 1927
 Pterolophia aethiopica Breuning, 1938
 Pterolophia albicollis Breuning, 1972
 Pterolophia alboantennata Breuning, 1938
 Pterolophia albocincta Gahan, 1894
 Pterolophia albomaculata Breuning, 1938
 Pterolophia albomarmorata Breuning, 1938
 Pterolophia alboplagiata Gahan, 1894
 Pterolophia albosignata (Blanchard, 1853)
 Pterolophia albovariegata Breuning, 1938
 Pterolophia albovitticollis Breuning, 1961
 Pterolophia alluaudi Breuning, 1938
 Pterolophia alorensis Breuning, 1958
 Pterolophia alternata Gressitt, 1938
 Pterolophia andamana Breuning, 1974
 Pterolophia andamanensis Breuning, 1938
 Pterolophia andamanica Breuning, 1938
 Pterolophia andrewesi Breuning, 1938
 Pterolophia angulata (Kolbe, 1893)
 Pterolophia angusta (Bates, 1873)
 Pterolophia annulitarsis (Pascoe, 1865)
 Pterolophia apicefusca Breuning, 1938
 Pterolophia apicemaculata Breuning, 1938
 Pterolophia apiceplagiata Breuning, 1938
 Pterolophia approximata Breuning, 1938
 Pterolophia arcuata Breuning, 1938
 Pterolophia ashantica Breuning, 1972
 Pterolophia assamensis Breuning, 1938
 Pterolophia assimilis Breuning, 1938
 Pterolophia assinica Breuning, 1970
 Pterolophia aurivillii Breuning, 1961
 Pterolophia baiensis Pic, 1926
 Pterolophia banksi Breuning, 1938
 Pterolophia barbieri Breuning, 1973
 Pterolophia basilana Breuning, 1938
 Pterolophia basileensis Lepesme & Breuning, 1953
 Pterolophia basilewskyi Breuning, 1968
 Pterolophia basispinosa Breuning, 1938
 Pterolophia bedoci Pic, 1929
 Pterolophia benjamini Breuning, 1938
 Pterolophia biarcuata (Thomson, 1858)
 Pterolophia biarcuatoides Breuning, 1943
 Pterolophia bicarinata Breuning, 1938
 Pterolophia bicoloriantennata Breuning, 1977  
 Pterolophia bifuscomaculata Breuning, 1976
 Pterolophia bigibbera (Newman, 1842)  
 Pterolophia bigibbicollis Breuning, 1967
 Pterolophia bigibbosa Breuning, 1970
 Pterolophia bigibbulosa (Pic, 1934)
 Pterolophia bigibbulosoides Breuning, 1968
 Pterolophia bilineaticeps Pic, 1926
 Pterolophia bilineaticollis (Pic, 1934)
 Pterolophia bilunata Breuning, 1938
 Pterolophia bimaculata Gahan, 1894
 Pterolophia bimaculaticeps Pic, 1926
 Pterolophia binaluanica Breuning & de Jong, 1941
 Pterolophia biochreovittata Breuning, 1976
 Pterolophia bipartita Pic, 1934
 Pterolophia bipostfasciculata Breuning, 1964
 Pterolophia birmanica Breuning, 1947
 Pterolophia bisbinodula (Quedenfeldt, 1883)
 Pterolophia bituberata Breuning, 1938
 Pterolophia bituberculatithorax Breuning, 1968
 Pterolophia bonthaini Breuning, 1966
 Pterolophia bottangensis Breuning, 1968
 Pterolophia brevicornis Breuning, 1939
 Pterolophia bryanti Breuning, 1938 
 Pterolophia buruensis Breuning, 1970
 Pterolophia caffrariae Breuning, 1940
 Pterolophia calceoides Breuning & de Jong, 1941
 Pterolophia cambodgensis Breuning, 1968
 Pterolophia canescens Breuning, 1939
 Pterolophia capensis Breuning, 1938
 Pterolophia capreola (Pascoe, 1865)
 Pterolophia carinipennis Gressitt, 1942
 Pterolophia carinulata Breuning, 1938
 Pterolophia castaneivora Ohbayashi & Hayashi, 1962
 Pterolophia caudata (Bates, 1873)
 Pterolophia ceylonensis Breuning, 1938
 Pterolophia ceylonica Breuning, 1938
 Pterolophia chapaensis Pic, 1929
 Pterolophia chinensis Breuning, 1982
 Pterolophia circulata Schwarzer, 1931
 Pterolophia clarior Breuning, 1970
 Pterolophia colasi Breuning, 1938
 Pterolophia collarti Breuning, 1960
 Pterolophia collartiana Breuning, 1962
 Pterolophia compacta Breuning, 1938
 Pterolophia confusa Breuning, 1938
 Pterolophia conjecta (Pascoe, 1865)
 Pterolophia consularis (Pascoe, 1866)
 Pterolophia convexa Breuning, 1938
 Pterolophia costulata Breuning, 1938
 Pterolophia crassepuncta Breuning, 1938
 Pterolophia crassipes (Wiedemann, 1823)
 Pterolophia curvatocostata Aurivillius, 1927
 Pterolophia dahomeica Breuning, 1970
 Pterolophia dalbergiae Breuning, 1938
 Pterolophia dapensis Pic, 1926
 Pterolophia dayremi Breuning, 1940
 Pterolophia decolorata (Heller, 1924)
 Pterolophia densefasciculata Breuning, 1938
 Pterolophia densepunctata Breuning, 1938
 Pterolophia dentaticornis Pic, 1929
 Pterolophia denticollis (Jordan, 1894)
 Pterolophia dentifera (Olivier, 1795)
 Pterolophia detersa (Pascoe, 1865)
 Pterolophia digesta Newman, 1842
 Pterolophia dorsivaria (Fairmaire, 1850)
 Pterolophia dubiosa Breuning, 1938
 Pterolophia dystasioides Breuning, 1943
 Pterolophia ecaudata Kolbe, 1894
 Pterolophia elegans Breuning, 1938
 Pterolophia elongata Pic, 1934
 Pterolophia elongatissima Breuning, 1938
 Pterolophia elongatula Breuning, 1938
 Pterolophia endroedyi Breuning, 1969
 Pterolophia enganensis (Gahan, 1907)
 Pterolophia eritreensis Breuning, 1958
 Pterolophia externemaculata Breuning, 1938
 Pterolophia fainanensis Pic, 1926
 Pterolophia fascicularis Breuning, 1938
 Pterolophia fasciolata (Fairmaire, 1895)
 Pterolophia ferrugata (Pascoe, 1865)
 Pterolophia ferruginea Breuning, 1938
 Pterolophia flavicollis Breuning, 1977
 Pterolophia flavofasciata Breuning, 1938
 Pterolophia flavolineata Breuning, 1938
 Pterolophia fletcheri Breuning, 1938
 Pterolophia fortescapa Breuning, 1961
 Pterolophia forticornis Breuning, 1938
 Pterolophia francoisi Breuning, 1972
 Pterolophia freyi Breuning, 1953
 Pterolophia fuchsi Breuning, 1970
 Pterolophia fukiena Gressitt, 1940
 Pterolophia fulvescens Breuning, 1938
 Pterolophia fulvisparsa Gahan, 1894
 Pterolophia fusca Breuning, 1969  
 Pterolophia fuscoapicata Breuning, 1938
 Pterolophia fuscocinerea Breuning, 1938
 Pterolophia fuscodiscalis Breuning, 1977
 Pterolophia fuscofasciata Breuning, 1938
 Pterolophia fuscomarmorata Breuning, 1977
 Pterolophia fuscoscutellata Breuning, 1938
 Pterolophia fuscosericea Breuning, 1938
 Pterolophia gabonica Breuning, 1938
 Pterolophia gardneri Schwarzer, 1931
 Pterolophia ghanaana Breuning, 1972
 Pterolophia ghanaensis Breuning, 1972
 Pterolophia globosa Breuning, 1939
 Pterolophia graciosa Breuning, 1938
 Pterolophia granulata (Motschulsky, 1866)
 Pterolophia granulosa Breuning, 1938
 Pterolophia griseofasciata Breuning, 1938
 Pterolophia grisescens (Pascoe, 1865)
 Pterolophia grossepuncticollis Breuning, 1974
 Pterolophia grossescapa Breuning, 1938
 Pterolophia guineensis (Thomson, 1864)
 Pterolophia henri-renaudi Breuning, 1962
 Pterolophia holobrunnea Breuning, 1977
 Pterolophia holorufa Breuning, 1969
 Pterolophia holzschuhi Breuning, 1975
 Pterolophia hongkongensis Gressitt, 1942
 Pterolophia horii Breuning & Ohbayashi, 1970
 Pterolophia horrida Breuning, 1938
 Pterolophia horridula Breuning, 1968
 Pterolophia humeralis Breuning, 1940
 Pterolophia illicita (Pascoe, 1865)
 Pterolophia inaequalis (Fabricius, 1801)
 Pterolophia inalbonotata (Pic, 1945)
 Pterolophia incerta Breuning, 1938
 Pterolophia indica Breuning, 1938
 Pterolophia inexpectata Breuning, 1938
 Pterolophia ingrata (Pascoe, 1864)
 Pterolophia instabilis Aurivillius, 1922
 Pterolophia insulana Breuning, 1939
 Pterolophia insulicola Breuning, 1938
 Pterolophia intuberculata Pic, 1930
 Pterolophia iringensis Breuning, 1977
 Pterolophia ivorensis Breuning, 1967 
 Pterolophia jacta Newman, 1842
 Pterolophia japonica Breuning, 1939
 Pterolophia javicola Fisher, 1936
 Pterolophia kaleea (Bates, 1866)
 Pterolophia kalisi Breuning, 1968
 Pterolophia kenyana Breuning, 1961
 Pterolophia keyensis Breuning, 1938
 Pterolophia kiangsina Gressitt, 1937
 Pterolophia kilimandjaroensis Breuning, 1970
 Pterolophia kinabaluensis Breuning, 1982
 Pterolophia kusamai Hasegawa & Makihara, 1999
 Pterolophia lama Breuning, 1943
 Pterolophia laterialba (Schwarzer, 1925)
 Pterolophia laterialbipennis Breuning, 1964
 Pterolophia lateripicta (Fairmaire, 1879)
 Pterolophia lateritia Breuning, 1939
 Pterolophia latipennis (Pic, 1938)
 Pterolophia leiopodina (Bates, 1873)
 Pterolophia lemoulti Breuning, 1939
 Pterolophia lepida Breuning, 1938
 Pterolophia lesnei Breuning, 1938
 Pterolophia leucoloma (Castelnau, 1840)
 Pterolophia lichenea Duvivier, 1892
 Pterolophia ligata (Pascoe, 1862)
 Pterolophia lobata Breuning, 1938
 Pterolophia lombokensis Breuning, 1982
 Pterolophia longicornis Breuning, 1975
 Pterolophia longiuscula Breuning, 1938
 Pterolophia lunulata (Hintz, 1919)
 Pterolophia luteomarmorata Breuning, 1938
 Pterolophia luzonicola Breuning, 1938
 Pterolophia m-griseum (Mulsant, 1846)
 Pterolophia maacki Blessig, 1873
 Pterolophia macra Breuning, 1943
 Pterolophia mallicolensis (Breuning, 1948)
 Pterolophia mandshurica Breuning, 1938
 Pterolophia matsushitai Breuning, 1938
 Pterolophia medioalbicollis Breuning, 1965
 Pterolophia mediofasciata Breuning, 1938
 Pterolophia mediofuscipennis Breuning, 1970
 Pterolophia mediophthalma Breuning, 1973
 Pterolophia mediopicta Breuning, 1940
 Pterolophia medioplagiata Breuning, 1938
 Pterolophia mediovittata Breuning & de Jong, 1941
 Pterolophia melanura (Pascoe, 1857)
 Pterolophia meridionalis Breuning, 1938
 Pterolophia microphthalma Breuning, 1961
 Pterolophia mimecyroschema Breuning, 1977
 Pterolophia mindanaonis Breuning, 1943
 Pterolophia minima Breuning, 1938
 Pterolophia ministrata (Pascoe, 1865)
 Pterolophia minor (Duvivier, 1891)
 Pterolophia minuta Breuning, 1938
 Pterolophia minutior Breuning, 1973
 Pterolophia minutissima Pic, 1926
 Pterolophia mispiloides Breuning, 1974
 Pterolophia montium (Hintz, 1919)
 Pterolophia mouhoti Breuning, 1973
 Pterolophia mozambica Breuning, 1971
 Pterolophia mucronata Breuning, 1938
 Pterolophia multicarinata Breuning, 1938
 Pterolophia multicarinipennis Breuning, 1957
 Pterolophia multifasciculata Pic, 1926
 Pterolophia multimaculata Pic, 1934
 Pterolophia multituberculata Breuning, 1970
 Pterolophia multituberculosa Téocchi, 1986
 Pterolophia mutata Breuning, 1943
 Pterolophia nigricans Breuning, 1938
 Pterolophia nigrobiarcuata Breuning, 1938
 Pterolophia nigrodorsalis Breuning & Itzinger, 1943
 Pterolophia nigrofasciculata Breuning, 1938
 Pterolophia nigrolineaticollis Breuning, 1961
 Pterolophia nigromaculipennis Breuning, 1968
 Pterolophia nigroornatipennis Breuning, 1965
 Pterolophia nigropicta Breuning, 1938
 Pterolophia nigroplagiata Breuning, 1938
 Pterolophia nigroscutellata Lepesme, 1953
 Pterolophia nigrosignata Breuning, 1969
 Pterolophia nigrosparsa (Kolbe, 1893)
 Pterolophia nigrovirgulata Breuning, 1939
 Pterolophia nobilis Breuning, 1943
 Pterolophia nodicollis Breuning, 1939
 Pterolophia obliquata Breuning & de Jong, 1941
 Pterolophia obliquealbovittata Breuning, 1977
 Pterolophia obliquefasciculata Breuning & de Jong, 1941
 Pterolophia obliquevittipennis Breuning, 1970
 Pterolophia obscura Schwarzer, 1925
 Pterolophia obscurata Breuning, 1938
 Pterolophia occidentalis Breuning, 1972
 Pterolophia occidentalis Schwarzer, 1931
 Pterolophia ochraceolineata Breuning, 1943
 Pterolophia ochreithorax Breuning, 1965
 Pterolophia ochreovittata Breuning, 1938
 Pterolophia omeishana Gressitt, 1945
 Pterolophia oopsida (Gahan, 1907)
 Pterolophia orientalis Breuning, 1937
 Pterolophia ovatula Breuning, 1939
 Pterolophia ovipennis Breuning, 1938
 Pterolophia pallidifrons Breuning, 1938
 Pterolophia parabaiensis Breuning, 1968
 Pterolophia paraflavescens Breuning, 1977
 Pterolophia paraforticornis Breuning, 1976
 Pterolophia paralatipennis Breuning, 1973
 Pterolophia paramicrophthalma Breuning, 1969
 Pterolophia paramulticarinata Breuning, 1977
 Pterolophia parangolensis Breuning, 1977
 Pterolophia parascripta Breuning, 1969
 Pterolophia paravariolosa Breuning, 1969
 Pterolophia parvula Breuning, 1938
 Pterolophia pasteuri Breuning, 1970
 Pterolophia penicillata (Pascoe, 1862)
 Pterolophia perakana Breuning, 1968
 Pterolophia persimilis Gahan, 1894
 Pterolophia persimiloides Breuning, 1968
 Pterolophia pfanneri Breuning, 1976
 Pterolophia plicata (Kolbe, 1893)
 Pterolophia pluricarinipennis Breuning, 1969
 Pterolophia plurifasciculata Breuning, 1943
 Pterolophia pontianakensis Breuning, 1974
 Pterolophia postbalteata Breuning, 1943
 Pterolophia postflavomaculata Breuning, 1969
 Pterolophia postfuscomaculata Breuning, 1973
 Pterolophia postmedioalba Breuning, 1961
 Pterolophia praeapicemaculata Breuning, 1966
 Pterolophia praeclara Breuning, 1970
 Pterolophia preapicecarinata Breuning, 1969
 Pterolophia propinqua (Pascoe, 1865)
 Pterolophia pseudapicata Breuning, 1961
 Pterolophia pseudobscuroides Breuning, 1938
 Pterolophia pseudocarinata Breuning, 1938
 Pterolophia pseudocaudata Breuning, 1961
 Pterolophia pseudoculata Breuning, 1938
 Pterolophia pseudoculatoides Breuning, 1968 
 Pterolophia pseudodapensis Breuning, 1947
 Pterolophia pseudolunigera Breuning, 1938
 Pterolophia pseudomucronata Breuning, 1943
 Pterolophia pseudosecuta Breuning, 1938
 Pterolophia pseudotincta Breuning, 1938
 Pterolophia punctigera (Pascoe, 1865)
 Pterolophia pusilla Breuning, 1938
 Pterolophia pygmaea Breuning, 1938
 Pterolophia quadricristata Breuning, 1938
 Pterolophia quadricristipennis Breuning, 1966
 Pterolophia quadricristulata Breuning, 1942
 Pterolophia quadrifasciata Gahan, 1894
 Pterolophia quadrifasciculata Breuning, 1938
 Pterolophia quadrifasciculatipennis Breuning, 1963
 Pterolophia quadrimaculata Breuning, 1938
 Pterolophia quadrinodosa Breuning & de Jong, 1941
 Pterolophia quadrivittata Breuning, 1938
 Pterolophia raffrayi Breuning, 1970
 Pterolophia reducta (Pascoe, 1865)
 Pterolophia reduplicata Gressitt, 1951
 Pterolophia rhodesiana Breuning, 1962   
 Pterolophia riouensis Breuning, 1938
 Pterolophia robinsoni (Gahan, 1906)
 Pterolophia robustior Breuning, 1961
 Pterolophia rubra Breuning, 1938
 Pterolophia rubricornis Gressitt, 1951
 Pterolophia rufescens (Pic, 1925)
 Pterolophia rufobrunnea Breuning, 1938
 Pterolophia rustenburgi Distant, 1898
 Pterolophia salebrosa Breuning, 1938
 Pterolophia sanghirica Gilmour, 1947
 Pterolophia sassensis Breuning, 1938
 Pterolophia schoudeteni Breuning, 1938
 Pterolophia scopulifera (Pascoe, 1865)
 Pterolophia scripta (Gerstaecker, 1871)
 Pterolophia scutellaris Breuning & de Jong, 1941
 Pterolophia secuta (Pascoe, 1865)
 Pterolophia semiarcuata Breuning, 1938
 Pterolophia semicircularis Breuning, 1938
 Pterolophia semilunaris Breuning, 1938
 Pterolophia serrata Gressitt, 1938
 Pterolophia serraticornis Breuning & de Jong, 1941
 Pterolophia serricornis Gressitt, 1937
 Pterolophia servilis Breuning, 1938
 Pterolophia siamana Breuning, 1970
 Pterolophia siamensis Breuning, 1938
 Pterolophia sibuyana Aurivillius, 1927
 Pterolophia sikkimana Breuning, 1973
 Pterolophia similata (Pascoe, 1865)
 Pterolophia similis (Jordan, 1894)
 Pterolophia simulans Breuning & de Jong, 1941
 Pterolophia sparsepuncticollis Breuning, 1961
 Pterolophia spinicornis Breuning, 1938
 Pterolophia spinifera (Quedenfeldt, 1888)
 Pterolophia sterculiae Breuning, 1938
 Pterolophia stheniodes Breuning, 1938
 Pterolophia subaequalis Breuning & de Jong, 1941
 Pterolophia subangusta Matsushita, 1933
 Pterolophia subbicarinata Breuning, 1968
 Pterolophia subchapaensis Breuning, 1968
 Pterolophia subflavescens Breuning, 1977
 Pterolophia subfulvisparsa Breuning, 1968
 Pterolophia subgrisescens Breuning, 1975
 Pterolophia subleiopodina Breuning & Ohbayashi, 1964
 Pterolophia subminutissima Breuning, 1966
 Pterolophia subnigrosparsa Breuning, 1961
 Pterolophia subovatula Breuning, 1977
 Pterolophia subrubra Breuning, 1968
 Pterolophia subtincta (Pascoe, 1865)
 Pterolophia subtubericollis Breuning, 1964
 Pterolophia subvariolosa Breuning, 1956
 Pterolophia suisapana Gressitt, 1951
 Pterolophia sulcatipennis Breuning & de Jong, 1941
 Pterolophia sumatrensis Breuning, 1938
 Pterolophia szetschuanica Breuning, 1973
 Pterolophia szewezycki Lepesme & Breuning, 1955
 Pterolophia tenebrica Breuning, 1938
 Pterolophia tenebricoides Breuning, 1976
 Pterolophia tengahensis Breuning, 1965
 Pterolophia teocchii Breuning, 1970
 Pterolophia thibetana Pic, 1925
 Pterolophia thomensis Breuning, 1938
 Pterolophia todui Breuning, 1982
 Pterolophia tonkinensis Breuning, 1938
 Pterolophia touzalini Breuning, 1973
 Pterolophia transversefasciatipennis Breuning, 1968
 Pterolophia transverseplagiata Breuning, 1938
 Pterolophia transverseunifasciata Breuning, 1972
 Pterolophia transversevittata Breuning, 1938
 Pterolophia triangularis Breuning, 1938
 Pterolophia trifasciculata Breuning, 1969
 Pterolophia tristis Breuning, 1938
 Pterolophia trivittata Breuning, 1940
 Pterolophia truncatipennis (Pic, 1951)
 Pterolophia tuberculatithorax Pic, 1926
 Pterolophia tuberculifera Breuning, 1938   
 Pterolophia tuberculithorax Breuning, 1973
 Pterolophia tubericollis Breuning, 1938
 Pterolophia tuberipennis Breuning, 1939
 Pterolophia tuberosithorax Breuning, 1939
 Pterolophia ugandae Breuning, 1938
 Pterolophia univinculata (Heller, 1924)  
 Pterolophia vagevittata Breuning, 1938
 Pterolophia varians Breuning, 1938
 Pterolophia variantennalis Breuning, 1970  
 Pterolophia varievittata Breuning, 1949
 Pterolophia variolosa (Kolbe, 1893)
 Pterolophia virgulata Breuning, 1939
 Pterolophia viridana Breuning, 1938
 Pterolophia vittata Breuning, 1938
 Pterolophia vittaticollis Breuning & de Jong, 1941
 Pterolophia vitticollis Newman, 1842
 Pterolophia wittmeri Breuning, 1975
 Pterolophia yenae Breuning, 1963
 Pterolophia yunnana Breuning, 1968
 Pterolophia ziczac Breuning, 1938
 Pterolophia zonata (Bates, 1873)

subgenus Scapopraonetha
 Pterolophia bella Breuning, 1940
 Pterolophia laterivitta Breuning, 1942
 Pterolophia pygmaeola Breuning, 1938
 Pterolophia quadriplagiata Breuning, 1938
 Pterolophia spiniscapus Breuning, 1942

subgenus Sociopraonetha
 Pterolophia nigrocincta Gahan, 1894

subgenus Sordidopraonetha
 Pterolophia caledonica Breuning, 1976
 Pterolophia fuscolineata Breuning, 1938
 Pterolophia major Breuning, 1938
 Pterolophia sordidata Pascoe, 1865
 Pterolophia tristoides Breuning, 1938

subgenus Tricholychrosis
 Pterolophia albosignata Breuning, 1973

subgenus Trichopraonetha
 Pterolophia albofasciata Breuning, 1938
 Pterolophia fuscomaculata Breuning, 1938
 Pterolophia pilosipennis Breuning, 1943
 Pterolophia plurialbostictica Breuning, 1974
 Pterolophia subalbofasciata Gilmour & Breuning, 1963 

subgenus Undulatopraonetha
 Pterolophia undulata (Pascoe, 1862)

subgenus Villosopraonetha
 Pterolophia javanica Breuning, 1938
 Pterolophia pilosella (Pascoe, 1865)
 Pterolophia trichofera Breuning, 1938
 Pterolophia villosa (Pascoe, 1866)

incertae sedis
 Pterolophia kubokii Hayashi, 1976

References